Juncus debilis, the weak rush, is a plant indigenous to the United States. It is listed as endangered in Massachusetts and New York, and as threatened in Rhode Island. It is listed as a species of special concern in Connecticut and believed extirpated in that state.

References

Flora of the United States
debilis